Defending champion Roger Federer defeated Richard Gasquet in the final, 6–3, 7–5, 7–6(7–4) to win the singles tennis title at the 2005 Hamburg European Open. He did not lose a single set in the entire tournament.

Seeds 
A champion seed is indicated in bold text while text in italics indicates the round in which that seed was eliminated.

  Roger Federer (champion)
  Andy Roddick (first round)
  Marat Safin (second round)
  Gastón Gaudio (third round)
  Tim Henman (third round)
  Rafael Nadal (withdrew because of a left hand injury)
  Carlos Moyá (withdrew because of a shoulder injury)
  Andre Agassi (first round)
  David Nalbandian (first round)
  Guillermo Coria (quarterfinals)
  Joachim Johansson (first round)
  Guillermo Cañas (second round)
  Ivan Ljubičić (second round)
  Tommy Robredo (third round)
  Nikolay Davydenko (semifinals)
  Radek Štěpánek (second round)

Draw

Finals

Top half

Section 1

Section 2

Bottom half

Section 3

Section 4

External links 
 2005 Hamburg Masters draw
 2005 Hamburg Masters qualifying draw

Singles